Afraid of Love may refer to:

"Afraid of Love", a song by Toto on the 1982 album Toto IV
Afraid of Love (film), a 1925 British silent drama film